Caroline Fritze (born 4 June 2000) is a German judoka. She is the silver medallist in the -57 kg at the 2021 Judo Grand Slam Paris

References

External links
 

2000 births
Living people
German female judoka
21st-century German women